José Antonio is a common pairing of personal names in Spanish and Portuguese, and may refer to:

Arts 

 Antonio Banderas, full name José Antonio Domínguez Bandera (born 1960), Spanish actor
 José Antonio Abreu (1939–2018), Venezuelan musician, educator and activist
 José Antonio Bottiroli (1920–1990), Argentine composer and poet
 José Antonio Bowen (born 1962), Spanish-American musician, author and academic
 José Antonio Burciaga (1940–1996), American artist and writer 
 José Antonio Cotrina (born 1972), Spanish writer
 José Antonio Dávila (1898–1941), Puerto Rican postmodern poet
 José António Duro (1875–1899), Portuguese poet
 José Antonio Molina (born 1960), Dominican conductor and composer
 José Antonio Muñoz (born 1942), Argentine artist
 José Antonio Porcel (1715–1794), Spanish poet and writer 
 José Antonio Santesteban (1835–1906), Spanish composer
 José Antonio Sistiaga (born 1932), Spanish artist and filmmaker
 José Antonio Torres (director) (born 1973), Mexican film director and musician
 José Antonio Torres Martinó (1916–2011), Puerto Rican artist and writer
 José Antonio Zapata (painter) (1762–1837), Spanish painter
 José Antonio Velásquez (1906–1983), Honduran painter
 Pepe Aguilar, full name José Antonio Aguilar Jiménez (born 1968), American singer-songwriter and actor
 Tony Plana, full name José Antonio Plana (born 1952), Cuban-American actor and director

Sports 

 Antonio Díaz (boxer), full name José Antonio Díaz (born 1976), Mexican world champion boxer
 Antonio Romero (canoeist), full name José Antonio Romero (born 1968), Mexican sprint canoer
 José Antonio Agudelo Gómez (born 1959), Colombian road racing cyclist
 José Antonio Aguirre (boxer) (born 1975), Mexican world champion boxer
 José António Bargiela (1957–2005), Portuguese footballer
 José Antonio Camacho (born 1955), Spanish footballer and football manager
 José Antonio Carrasco (born 1980), Spanish road racing cyclist
 José Antonio Caro (footballer, born 1993), Spanish footballer
 José Antonio Caro (footballer, born 1994), Spanish footballer
 José Antonio Casanova (1918–1999), Venezuelan baseball player and manager
 José Antonio Casilla (born 1979), Spanish Olympic volleyball player
 José Antonio Castillo (born 1970), Spanish footballer
 José Antonio Castro (born 1980), Mexican footballer, football manager
 José Antonio Cecchini (born 1955), Spanish Olympic wrestler
 José Antonio Colado (born 1976), Spanish sport shooter
 José Antonio Colon (born 1948), Puerto Rican boxer
 José Antonio Crespo (born 1977), Spanish badminton player
 José Antonio Culebras (born 1979), Spanish footballer 
 José Antonio de Segovia (born 1982), Spanish road racing cyclist
 José Antonio Díez (born 1982), Spanish cyclo-cross cyclist
 José Antonio Delgado (1965–2006), Venezuelan mountaineer
 José Antonio Díaz (fencer) (born 1938), Cuban fencer
 José Antonio Duran (born 1946), Mexican Olympic boxer
 José Antonio Escuredo (born 1970), Spanish Olympic track racing cyclist
 José Antonio Espín (born 1985), Spanish footballer 
 José Antonio Franco (footballer, born 1979), Paraguayan footballer 
 José Antonio García Fernández (born 1992), Mexican footballer
 José Antonio Garcia Mena (born 1980), Spanish dressage rider
 José Antonio Gordillo (born 1974), Spanish footballer and football manager
 José António Gregório (born 1939), Portuguese Olympic wrestler
 José Antonio Hermida (born 1978), Spanish cross-country cyclist
 José Antonio Hernández (born 1995), Mexican footballer 
 José Antonio Hernando (born 1963), Spanish Olympic boxer
 José Antonio Iglesias (born 1965), Spanish Olympic field hockey player
 José António Inácio (born 1967), Angolan Olympic judoka
 José Antonio Irulegui (born 1937), Spanish footballer and football manager
 José Antonio Latorre (born 1941), Spanish footballer
 José Antonio Llamas (born 1985), Spanish footballer
 José Antonio López (born 1976), Spanish road racing cyclist
 José Antonio Martiarena (born 1968), Spanish Olympic track racing cyclist
 José Antonio Martínez Gil (born 1993), Spanish footballer
 José Antonio Medina (born 1996), Mexican footballer
 José Antonio Merín (born 1970), Spanish Olympic rower
 José Antonio Michelena (born 1988), Argentine footballer
 José Antonio Momeñe (1940–2010), Spanish road racing cyclist
 José Antonio Montero (born 1967), Spanish basketball player
 José Antonio Nogueira (born 1965), Brazilian football manager
 José Antonio Patlán (born 1983), Mexican footballer
 José Antonio Pavón Jiménez (1754–1840), Spanish botanist
 José Antonio Pecharromán (born 1978), Spanish road racing cyclist
 José Antonio Peral (born 1992), Spanish footballer
 José Antonio Picón (born 1988), Spanish footballer
 José Antonio Pikabea (born 1970), Spanish footballer
 José Antonio Querejeta (born 1957), Spanish basketball player turned executive
 José Antonio Redolat (born 1976), Spanish middle-distance runner
 José Antonio Redondo (born 1985), Spanish road racing cyclist
 José Antonio Reyes (1983–2019), Spanish footballer
 José Antonio Ríos (born 1990), Spanish footballer 
 José Antonio Rivera (born 1973), American world champion boxer
 José Antonio Roca (1928–2007), Mexican footballer, football manager
 José Antonio Salguero (born 1960), Spanish footballer
 José Antonio Santamaría (1946–1993), Spanish footballer
 José Antonio Santana (born 1981), Spanish footballer
 José Antonio Saro (born 1938), Spanish footballer 
 José Antonio Serrano Ramos (born 1984), Spanish footballer
 José Antonio Solano (born 1985), Spanish footballer
 José Antonio Tébez (1949–2018), Argentine footballer
 José Antonio Urquijo (born 1960), Chilean track racing cyclist
 José Antonio Villanueva (born 1979), Spanish track racing cyclist
 José Antonio Zaldúa (1941–2018), Spanish footballer 
 José Bautista, full name José Antonio Bautista Santos (born 1980), Dominican MLB baseball player
 José Chamot, full name José Antonio Chamot (born 1969), Argentine footballer and football manager 
 José Iglesias, full name José Antonio Iglesias Alemán (born 1990), Cuban-American MLB baseball player
 José Madueña, full name José Antonio Madueña Lopez (born 1990), Mexican footballer
 José Rijo, full name José Antonio Rijo Abreu (born 1965), Dominican MLB baseball player
 José-Antonio Chalbaud (born 1931), Venezuelan Olympic sports shooter
 Nono (Spanish footballer), full name José Antonio Delgado Villar (born 1993), Spanish footballer

Government, religious, revolutionary and military leaders 

 José Antonio Acosta (17??–?), Spanish colonial Roman Catholic priest
 José Antonio Aguiriano (1932–1996), Spanish socialist politician
 José Antonio Aguirre (politician) (1904–1960), Spanish footballer and Basque politician
 José Antonio de Alzate y Ramírez (1737–1799), Spanish priest, scientist, historian and cartographer
 José Antonio Alonso (1960–2017), Spanish politician and judge
 José Antonio Anzoátegui (1789–1819), Venezuelan military leader in War of Independence from Spain
 José Antonio Aponte (c. 1760–1812), Cuban activist, military officer and leader of slave revolt
 José Antonio Aysa (born 1943), Mexican politician
 José Antonio Cabrera (1768–1820), Argentine statesman
 José Antonio Cabello (born 1964), Mexican politician 
 José Antonio Carrillo (1796–1862), Californio rancher, officer, and politician
 José Antonio Chang (born 1958), Chinese-Peruvian Prime Minister of Peru
 José Antonio Dias Toffoli (born 1967), Brazilian President of the Supreme Federal Court of Brazil
 José Antonio Díaz García (born 1964), Mexican politician
 José Antonio Durán (1810–c. 1880), Argentine soldier and politician
 José Antonio Echeverría (1932–1957), Cuban revolutionary and student leader
 José Antonio Eguren (born 1956), Peruvian Roman Catholic Church archbishop 
 José Antonio Fortea (born 1968), Spanish Roman Catholic priest, exorcist and writer
 José Antonio Gandarillas (1839–1913), Chilean politician
 José Antonio García Belaúnde (born 1948), Peruvian diplomat
 José Antonio Girón (1911–1995), Spanish politician
 José Antonio Gómez Urrutia (born 1953), Chilean politician
 José Antonio Griñán (born 1946), Spanish politician
 José Antonio Gutiérrez (1980–2003), Guatemalan, first US Marine killed in Iraq War
 José Antonio Haghenbeck (born 1955), Mexican politician and surgeon
 José Antonio Kast (born 1966), Chilean politician
 José Antonio Labordeta (1935–2010), Spanish singer-songwriter, journalist, politician
 José Antonio Lacayo de Briones y Palacios (1679–1756), Spanish colonial governor
 José Antonio León Mendivil (born 1946), Mexican politician
 José Antonio Llama (born 1941), Cuban-American anti-Castro conspirator
 José Antonio Maceo Grajales (1845–1896), Cuban military leader
 José Antonio Meade (born 1969), Mexican politician and diplomat
 José Antonio Medeiros (born 1970), Brazilian politician
 José Antonio Mexía (c. 1800–1839), Mexican politician and rebel general
 José Antonio Mijares (1819–1847), Mexican soldier
 José Antonio Mora (1897–1975), Uruguayan politician and diplomat
 José Antonio Muñiz (1919–1960), Puerto Rican national guard commander
 José Antonio Navarro (1795–1871), Texas statesman and revolutionary
 José Antonio Ocampo (born 1952), Colombian economist, professor and statesman in international development
 José Antonio Ortega Lara (born 1958), Spanish kidnap victim turned politician
 José Antonio Páez (1790–1873), Venezuelan military leader and politician
 José Antonio Pérez Sánchez (1947–2020), Mexican Roman Catholic bishop
 José Antônio Peruzzo (born 1960), Brazilian Roman Catholic archbishop
 José Antonio Price (1890–1951), Panamanian politician and physician
 José Antonio Pujante (1964–2019), Spanish politician and philosophy professor
 José Antonio Remón Cantera (1908–1955), President of Panama 
 José Antonio Reynafé (1796–1837), Argentine military leader and politician
 José Antonio Roméu (c. 1742–1792), Spanish colonial governor
 José Antonio Romualdo Pacheco (1831–1899), American politician and diplomat
 José Antonio Saco (1797–1879), Cuban statesman, politician, writer, anthropologist and historian
 José Antonio Salcedo (1816–1864), Dominican revolutionary leader and Head of State
 José Antônio Saraiva (1823–1895), Brazilian politician and diplomat
 José Antonio Saravia (1785–1871), Spanish-Russian army officer
 José Antonio Souto (1938–2017), Spanish jurist and politician
 José Antonio Velutini Ron (1844–1912), Venezuelan military leader, politician and statesman
 José Antonio Vivó Undabarrena (1930–1979), Spanish politician 
 José Antonio Yorba (1743–1825), Spanish soldier and landowner in Spanish California
 Josu Urrutikoetxea, full name José Antonio Urrutikoetxea Bengoetxea (born 1950), Spanish separatist leader
 Simón Bolívar, full name José Antonio de la Santísima Trinidad Bolívar... (1783–1830), liberator of South America

Business, science and technology 
 José Antonio Alvarez (born 1960), Spanish corporate executive
 José Antonio Attolini Lack (1931–2012), Mexican architect
 José Antonio Fernández Carbajal (born 1954), Mexican corporate executive
 Jose Antonio Ortega Bonet (1929–2009), Cuban-American entrepreneur and businessman
 José Antonio Sosa (born 1957), Spanish architect and researcher, member of the Royal Spanish Academy

Other 
 José Antonio González (disambiguation)
 José Antonio Rodríguez (disambiguation)
 José Antonio Aguirre (early Californian) (1799–1860), Spanish settler in Alta California
 José Antonio Estudillo (1803–1852), Californio settler of San Diego, California
 José Antonio Fernández de Castro (1887–1951), Cuban journalist and writer
 José Antonio Gurriarán (1938–2019), Spanish journalist
 José Antonio Primo de Rivera (born 1903), Spanish lawyer and fascist politician
 Jose Antonio Vargas (born 1981), Filipino-American journalist, filmmaker, and immigration rights activist

See also 
 José (disambiguation)
 Antonio (disambiguation)
 Antonio José (disambiguation)